David Peter Bloom is a twice convicted American fraudster who defrauded investors of almost $15 million in the 1980s.

Early life

Bloom grew up on the Upper East Side of Manhattan and attended Trinity School where he graduated in 1982. After graduating from Duke University, Bloom returned to New York to start an investment company under the name of Greater Sutton Investors Group Inc.

Criminal inquiries and conviction in 1988

In 1988, the U.S. Securities and Exchange Commission (SEC) accused Bloom of using his unregistered investment business to collect over $10 million between 1985 and 1988 from over 140 clients for his personal gain. Instead of making investments on behalf of his clients, Bloom was accused of acquiring art, real estate and other personal assets with his clients funds.

Notable investors in Bloom's scheme included the Sultan of Brunei, Bill Cosby, and the Rockefeller family.

Bloom settled with the SEC without admitting guilt and agreed to hand over all his assets to a court-appointed receiver. He also was barred for life from the securities industry, including association with any broker, dealer, investment adviser, investment company, or municipal securities dealer. 

Two days after his settlement with the SEC, Bloom was charged by federal prosecutors in Manhattan for violations of the registration and antifraud provisions of the Investment Advisers Act of 1940. Bloom pleaded guilty, waiving indictment,to one count each of mail and securities fraud. He was sentenced to eight years in prison for defrauding investors of almost $15 million. Bloom served 5 years out of his 8-year sentence, at the Federal Correctional Complex, Allenwood, in Pennsylvania.

Due to Bloom's young age at the time of his criminal activity, the press referred to him as a whiz kid; most often the "Wall Street Whiz Kid".

Bloom's parents were later sued for $191,250 that Bloom spent on them, and they settled for $30,000.

Criminal inquiries and conviction in 2000

Bloom was sentenced in 2000 and served five years in prison for defrauding at least 10 people out of over $50,000. He pleaded guilty to charges of grand larceny and scheming to defraud and was released in 2006 on parole.

Criminal inquiries in 2022

On 9 August, 2022, Bloom was arrested on suspicion of 12 counts of grand theft in Los Angeles and he posted $45,000 bail. The district attorney is currently reviewing the case for charges.

References

1964 births
Living people
American male criminals
20th-century American criminals
American people convicted of mail and wire fraud